Yann Benoist (born 6 February 1951) is a French session guitarist, performer, singer , composer, conductor, and arranger.

Early life
Yann Benoist was born in Dinan, Brittany.  At age 8 his parents enrolled him in a music academy. They bought him his first guitar when he was eleven and he started learning to play with friends and different teachers.

Career
When Benoist was 18 he started playing and singing , juggling time between school and gigging  with some local bands in Brittany and Normandy.

During 1975 he worked with the Switzerland duet . The next year, he learned for a while with Pierre Cullaz (famous sessionman from the sixties ) in Paris.

By the end of the seventies he was a member of the  quartet. That same year he got a certificate from the Berklee College of Music.

Since then he has worked on stage or sessions for commercials, TV movies, TV shows,
and musical comedies, with numerous French stars such as Renaud,
Gilbert Becaud, Serge Lama, Patricia Kaas, Mireille Mathieu, Richard Bohringer, Jean Guidoni, Sylvie Vartan, Sheila (singer), Hugues Aufray, Jean-Luc Lahaye, Julien Clerc, Dave (singer), Patrick Hernandez, Nancy Holloway, Marcel Azzola, Sacha Distel, Murray Head, Maurane, Marie Myriam, Francis Cabrel, Smain, Dorothée, Gilles Servat, William Sheller, Jacques Loussier, and Michel Legrand.

In 1983 he was a member of Space,
with Didier Marouani, for the first big tour organized in the USSR. They performed 21 concerts in Moscow's Olympic Stadium, Leningrad's Saint-Petersburg Sports and Concert Complex and Kyiv's Palace of Sports for about 600,000 people, and in 1992 they performed the first concert authorized on the Red Square in Moscow, for 360,000 people.

In 1989 and 2002 he was musical director for Sheila at the Olympia. In 2011 he was conductor for Joel Prevost at the Alhambra.

He is a composer for APM Music and Universal Publishing.

Selective discography

As a leader 
 1987 Bye Bye Femme (CFD) 
 1997 Rainbowcity (Night And Day distribution) (Spotify)
 2003 Décalage  (Spotify)
 2021 Hard Groove (Diggin' Miles Davis, Randy Brecker) (InouÏe Distribution) (Spotify)

As a sideman 

 Marie Myriam J'aime quand tu es jaloux (Ariola)
 Renaud  (Polydor)
 Richard Sanderson Surprise (Vogue)
 William Sheller  (Philips Records)
 Didier Marouani et Paris-France-Transit Space Concerts en URSS (Vogue)

 Richard SandersonFairy Tales (Vogue)
 Bibie Tout doucement (CBS)
 Daniel Lévi Cocktail (EMI)
 Jean-Luc Lahaye Flagrant Délit de Tendresse (Philips)
 Jean-Luc Lahaye Live au Palais des Sports (Philips)
    One Two Three  (Polydor)
 Sheila  (Polygram)
 Sacha Distel Les Plus Grands Succes De Sacha Distel  (Carrere)
 Sylvie Vartan Concert à Sofia Sylvie Vartan discography (Philips)
 Didier Marouani Space (French band)  Space Magic Concerts(BMG Russia)
  Sheila On S'Dit plus rien (Carrere Music)
 Nana Mouskouri Hollywood (Philips)
 Jana Herzen Soup's on Fire (Motema Music)
 Renaud     (Virgin)
 Dave (Sony Music)
 Gilbert Bécaud  (BMG)
  Sheila     (Flarenash)
  Sheila   (Wagram Music)
 Alabina Sahara (Sony Music)
 Didier Marouani Space (French band) Symphonic Space Dream (BMG Russia)
  Sheila   (EMI)
  Sheila Medley Disco (Wagram Music)
 Serge Lama    (WEA)
  Sheila   (Warner Music )
  Sheila   (Warner Music)
  Serge Lama  (Warner Music)
  Serge Lama  (Wea Music)
 Gilbert Bécaud Suite (Capitol Music)
  Da Vinci Vox  The Hidden Message (EMI Label One)
 Manau  Seul Et En Silence - Acoustique 2007
  Yvon Chateigner (feat) Ornella Vanoni L'amore l'AmoreUniversal)
 Iwan B La Quête, Ar C'hlask (Coop Breizh)

Videos

 Renaud La Chetron Sauvage (Live Zénith 1986)
 Jean-Luc Lahaye Débarquez Moi (Live Palais des Sports 1987)
  Sheila  Je suis venue te dire que je m'en vais (Live Olympia 1989)
 Mireille Mathieu  Live Palais 1990
 Sylvie Vartan    Concert a Sofia
 Dorothée  L'album en Video
  Sheila Sheila à L'Olympia 1999

DVDs

As a leader 

  Rencontre d'un Soir (guest): Martin Taylor (guitarist), Iwan B

As a sideman 

 Sheila (singer)  
 Space Concert In Moscow (once upon a time in the East)
  Space Space Magic Concerts
 Serge Lama Un jour , une vie (Live Bercy)
  Sheila Sheila Live 89 à l'Olympia
 Renaud La Chetron sauvage (Virgin music)

Composer 

 1983 Alliance (Tabata Music) (Various Composers)
 1987 Bye bye femme (CFD)
 1997 Rainbowcity (Night and Day) (Spotify)
including  :Gilbert Bécaud B+B(je t'appartiens) Composer Yann Benoist Lyrics Pierre Delanoë / Manny Curtis
 2001 Serge Lama " Feuilles à feuilles" (Various composers)
 2002 Décalage (Sobridis musique)  (Spotify)
 2005 RockAnd Roll Comedy (UPPM) (Various Composers) (Spotify)
 2006 French Songs Universal Publishing (UPPM) (Spotify)
 2007 Rock And Roll Comedy 2 (UPPM) (Various Composers)
 2010 Funk Addict APM Music (Spotify)
 2012 Indie Rock Session (KAPAGAMA) (Spotify)
 2015 Sunny Guitars (Musique & Music)" Echappée Belle " (Various Composers) (Spotify)
 2016 Melody Box " Des Racines et des Ailes " (Various Composers)
 2018 CDM Music (Picking) "La Maison France 5" (Various Composers)
 2019 Encore Merci Publishing  "Acoustic Ballads"  https://www.bammusic.com/fr-ca/release/acoustic_ballads/e4790dcb4fed04b7

Movie TV scores 

 1979 Les Joyeuses Colonies de vacances
 1990 Envoyé spécial    Envoyé spécial
 1992 Les Taupes-Niveaux
 1993 Envoyé Spécial   Envoyé spécial
 1994 Jeanne
 1996 La Guerre Des Poux

Bibliography 

 Serge Lama "La rage de vivre " (Fréderic Quinonero) Ed L'Archipel (September 2021)
 JazzBluesNews ( July 2021 ) Yann Benoist Interview http://jazzbluesnews.com/2021/07/18/yann-benoist/
 Blues& Co N° 83 (Mars, April, May 2018) "Le Blues des Soviets" ( Yann Benoist Interview )
 Dominique Grandfils "Anthologie du Rock Français de 1956 à 2017"  Ed Camion Blanc ( June 2017 )
 Renaud "Des que le vent soufflera "(Regis Lefévre) Ed Pierre-Marcel Favre (July 1985)
 Bécaud "L'Homme à la cravate à pois" (Bernard Reval)Ed Du Voyage (1995)
 Mathias "L' amour "a capella" ( Mathias Ollivier ) Ed Art Access (April 2015)
 Guitar et bass N° 47 January 98  (A.Brodzki)  
 Armor magazine N°442 November 2006 Yannick Pelletier  
 Home-Studio N° 253 July/August 2010 (Olivia Clain)  
 Sheila "Star Française "(Frederic Quinero) Ed Didier Carpentier (2012)

References

External links 

 

French guitarists
French male guitarists
French composers
French male composers
1951 births
Living people